Giorgos Patis (born 16 April 16 1983) is a badminton player from Greece. He competed at the 2004 Summer Olympics.

Career 
Patis competed in badminton at the 2004 Summer Olympics in the men's doubles with partner Theodoros Velkos. They were defeated in the round of 32 by Chan Chong Ming and Chew Choon Eng of Malaysia.

Achievements

IBF International (1 title, 2 runners-up) 
Men's doubles

References

External links 
European results
Tournamentsoftware.com

1983 births
Living people
Greek male badminton players
Badminton players at the 2004 Summer Olympics
Olympic badminton players of Greece
Sportspeople from Thessaloniki